The Erycinae, also known as the Old World sand boas, are a subfamily of nonvenomous snakes in the family Boidae. Species of the subfamily Erycinae are found in Europe, Asia Minor, Africa, Arabia, central and southwestern Asia, India, Sri Lanka, and western North America. Four genera comprising 18 species are currently recognized as being valid.

Description
Erycinae is a subfamily of stout-bodied snakes, all of which are competent burrowers. The largest, E. johnii, rarely exceeds  in total length (including tail). They have small eyes and hard, small scales to protect their skin from the grit of sand. A great deal of sexual dimorphism exists, with females generally becoming much larger than males.

Erycines have skeletal adaptations to burrowing. The skull is more compact than in the subfamily Boinae. Also, the vertebrae of the tail are increased in size but reduced in number.

Distribution and habitat
Erycines are found in Southeastern Europe, Asia Minor, North, Central, West and East Africa, Arabia, Central and Southwest Asia, India, Sri Lanka, southwestern Canada, the western United States, and northwestern Mexico.

Fossil erycines have been found in rock strata over 50 million years old, and were once widespread in North America. Now, only four species remain in North America, as well as the Old World sand boas proper in Africa, Asia, and Southeastern Europe.

The oldest known erycines are from the Eocene-aged Messel Pit in Germany.

Behavior
The majority of sand boas spend much of their time basking below the surface of the sand, with only their eyes or head exposed. When potential prey approaches, they erupt out of the sand, bite, and employ constriction to subdue it.

Feeding
The erycines' primary diet is rodents, but they have also been known to prey on lizards and birds.

Reproduction
Otherwise far removed from their boine relatives, erycines are generally ovoviviparous, i.e., giving birth to live young. At least three species lay eggs, however: the Calabar python, Calabaria reinhardtii (once regarded as a python for this reason), the Arabian sand boa, Eryx jayakari, and the West African sand boa, E. muelleri.

Smuggling and poaching in India
Poaching and smuggling of sand boas is often reported in India. Most of the smuggled snakes go to the United States. There is a misconception about their medicinal and aphrodisiacal properties, as well as the belief that keeping this snake as a pet brings wealth and prosperity.

Captivity
Eryx colubrinus, E. conicus and E. johnii are frequently available in the exotic pet trade and are often captive-bred. They breed readily, their small size making them an attractive option. They are usually not aggressive species, though they sometimes have a tendency to bite, and also spend the vast majority of their time hiding.  Other species are not commonly available, but are occasionally imported.

Genera

 Not including the nominate subspecies. T Type genus.

See also
List of erycine species and subspecies

References

Further reading
Bonaparte, Carlo Luciano (1831). Saggio di una distribuzione metodica degli animali vertebrati. Rome: Antonio Boulzaler. 144 pp. (Subfamily "Erycina [sic]", p. 67). (in Italian).
Goin, C.J.; Goin, O.B.; Zug, G.R. (1978). Introduction to Herpetology. Third Edition. San Francisco: W.H. Freeman and Company. xi + 378 pp. . (Subfamily Erycinae, p. 319).

External links

The Sand Boa Page at Kingsnake.com. Accessed 16 July 2008. 

 
Snake subfamilies
Taxa named by Charles Lucien Bonaparte